Hunan Television or Hunan TV is a state-owned provincial satellite TV station launched on 29 September 1970 and is currently China's second-most-watched channel, second only to CCTV-1, owned by China Central Television, although Hunan STV occasionally overtook CCTV-1 in ratings. Owned by Hunan Broadcasting System, Hunan TV's signal covers most of China, including Macau, Hong Kong, Taiwan and overseas as (Hunan STV World) in Japan, South Korea, Southeast Asia, Americas, Tajikistan, Papua New Guinea, New Zealand, Fiji, Australia, South Africa, Canada, United States, India, Nepal, Africa, Europe and other countries and regions landing. The channel broadcasts in high-definition since September 28, 2009. The appearance of its logo has resulted in the nickname of Mango TV.

History 
On Dec 15, 2006, Hunan TV cooperated with BBC to broadcast a new program, “Just the Two of Us”. It is the first entertainment collaboration between Chinese television and the BBC on a global scale.

On May 20, 2009, HunanTV World launched in Hong Kong. It is the first permitted "international channel". Aria Jin served as the "Shoot, Brother!".

Up to the year 2013, HSTV covers over 1 billion of the Chinese population, 358 million of them had claimed to like HSTV's programs. There are 210 million people watch HSTV every day. HSTV's online platform has 730 million views.

In 2015, because of State Administration of Press, Publication, Radio, Film and Television's policies, HSTV had made prime time television airing from broadcasting 3 episodes per night to 2, and changed the start of airing time from 19:30 to 20:00. It is the only channel that airs drama at 22:00 other than CCTV.

In 2017, the Hunan provincial committee of the Chinese Communist Party criticized Hunan TV as a "platform for gay entertainment" and for having "failed to fulfill the mission of being a mouthpiece of the Party."

Notable programs 
Happy Camp
Super Girl
Super Boy
Where Are We Going, Dad?
I Am a Singer
Super-Vocal
Day Day Up
Come Sing with Me
72 Floors of Mystery
Chinese Restaurant
Takes a Real Man
Back to Field

References

External links

Television channels and stations established in 1970
Television networks in China
Mass media in Changsha
1970 establishments in China
Hunan Broadcasting System